The Battle of Fort Duquesne was British assault on the eponymous French fort (later the site of Pittsburgh) that was repulsed with heavy losses on 14 September 1758, during the French and Indian War.

The attack on Fort Duquesne was part of a large-scale British expedition with 6,000 troops led by General John Forbes to drive the French out of the contested Ohio Country (the upper Ohio River Valley) and clear the way for an invasion of Canada. Forbes ordered Major James Grant of the 77th Regiment to reconnoiter the area with 850 men. Grant, apparently on his own initiative, proceeded to attack the French position using traditional European military tactics. His force was out-maneuvered, surrounded, and largely destroyed by the French and their native allies led by François-Marie Le Marchand de Lignery. Major Grant was taken prisoner and the British survivors retreated fitfully to Fort Ligonier.

After repulsing this advance party, the French, deserted by some of their native allies and vastly outnumbered by the approaching Forbes, blew up their magazines and burnt Fort Duquesne. In November the French withdrew from the Ohio Valley and British colonists erected Fort Pitt on the site.

Forbes commanded between 5,000 and 7,000 men, including a contingent of Virginians led by George Washington. Forbes, very ill, did not keep up with the advance of his army, but entrusted it to his second in command, Lt. Col. Henry Bouquet, a Swiss officer commanding a battalion of the Royal American Regiment. Bouquet sanctioned a reconnaissance of Fort Duquesne by Major James Grant of Ballindalloch.

Battle
On September 11, 1758, Grant led over 800 men to scout the environs of Fort Duquesne ahead of Forbes' main column. Bouquet believed the fort to be held by 500 French and 300 Indians, a force too strong to be attacked by Grant's detachment. Grant, who arrived in the vicinity of the fort on September 13, believed there were only 200 enemy within the fort, and sent a small party of 50 men forward to scout. These saw no enemy outside the fort; they burned a storehouse and returned to Grant's main position, two miles (3 km) from the fort.

The next morning, Grant divided his force into several parts. A company of the 77th, under a Capt. McDonald, approached the fort with drums beating and pipes playing as a decoy. A force of 400 men lay in wait to ambush the enemy when they went out to attack McDonald, and several hundred more under the Virginian Maj. Andrew Lewis were concealed near the force's baggage train in the hope of surprising an enemy attack there ...

The French and Indian force was in fact much larger than anticipated, and moved swiftly. They overwhelmed McDonald's decoy force and overran the party that had been meant to ambush them. Lewis's force left its ambush positions and went to the aid of the rest of the force but the French and Indians had by then gained a point of high ground above them and forced them to retire. The Indians used the forest to their advantage; "concealed by a thick foliage, their heavy and destructive fire could not be returned with any effect". In the one-sided battle in the woods, the British and American force suffered 342 casualties, of whom 232 were from the 77th Regiment, including Grant, who was taken prisoner. Out of the eight officers in Andrew Lewis's Virginian contingent, 5 were killed, 1 was wounded and Lewis himself was captured. Nevertheless, most of Grant's force escaped to rejoin the main army under Forbes and Bouquet. The Franco-Indian force suffered only 8 killed and 8 wounded.

James Smith wrote "Notwithstanding their (the Indians') vigilance, Colonel Grant, with his Highlanders, stole a march upon them, and in the night took possession of a hill about eighty rod from Fort Du Quesne; this hill is on that account called Grant's Hill to this day. The French and Indians knew not that Grant and his men were there until they beat the drum and played upon the bagpipes, just at daylight. They then flew to arms, and the Indians ran up under cover of the banks of Allegheny and Monongahela, for some distance, and then sallied out from the banks of the rivers, and took possession of the hill above Grant; and as he was on the point of it in sight of the fort, they immediately surrounded him, and as he had his Highlanders in ranks, and in very close order, and the Indians scattered, and concealed behind trees, they defeated him with the loss only of a few warriors; most of the Highlanders were killed or taken prisoners."

A plaque on the Allegheny County Courthouse, erected in 1901 commemorates the site of the battle, and the hill where the battle was fought is today called Grant Street, in Pittsburgh.

French retreat
Though the French had beaten off the initial British attack, Lignery understood that his force of about 600 could not hold Fort Duquesne against the main British force of more than ten times that number. The French continued to occupy Fort Duquesne until November 26, when the garrison set fire to the fort and left under the cover of darkness. As the British marched up to the smoldering remains, they were confronted with an appalling sight. The Indians had decapitated many of the dead Highlanders and impaled their heads on the sharp stakes on top of the fort walls, with their kilts displayed below. The British and Americans rebuilt Fort Duquesne, naming it Fort Pitt after the British prime minister William Pitt, who had ordered the capture of that strategic location.

Notes

References
Anderson, Fred. Crucible of War: The Seven Years War and the Fate of Empire in British North America, 1754-1766 (2000) pp 267–285
Chartrand, Rene. Tomahawk and Musket; French and Indian Raids in the Ohio Valley 1758. (2012) Osprey Publishing. Osprey Raid Series #27. 

 This includes letters from both Grant and Washington discussing the action.
 McConnell, Michael N.  A Country Between: The Upper Ohio Valley and Its Peoples, 1724-1774 (1992).

Stewart, David, Sketches of the Character, Manners and Present State of the Highlanders of Scotland, 2 volumes, John Donald Publishers Ltd., Edinburgh, 1977 (originally published in 1822)
 White, Richard. Middle Ground: Indians, Empires, and Republics in the Great Lakes Region, 1650-1815 (1991)

Primary sources
 The Papers of Henry Bouquet : Volume II The Forbes Expedition ed. by Donald Kent et al.  (1951) 
 Writings of General John Cabot Forbes Relating to his Service in North America (1938)
 The Papers of George Washington, Colonial Series, volume 5 October 1757-September 1758 ed by W.  W.  Abbott et al. (1988)

Battle of Fort Duquesne
Battles of the French and Indian War
Battles involving France
Battles involving Great Britain
Battle of Fort Duquesne
Battle of Fort Duquesne
Battle of Fort Duquesne
Battles in Pennsylvania
Battle of Fort Duquesne